Jemna  is a village in the administrative district of Gmina Stoszowice, within Ząbkowice Śląskie County, Lower Silesian Voivodeship, in southwestern Poland. Prior to 1945, it was in Germany.

References

Jemna